Sri Jayatirtha, also known as Teekacharya (1345 - 1388), was a Hindu philosopher, dialectician, polemicist and the sixth pontiff of Madhvacharya Peetha from (1365 – 1388). He is considered to be one of the most important seers in the history of Dvaita school of thought on account of his sound elucidations of the works of Madhvacharya. He is credited with structuring the philosophical aspects of Dvaita and through his polemical works, elevating it to an equal footing with the contemporary schools of thought.  Along with Madhva and Vyasatirtha, he is venerated as one of the three great spiritual sages, or munitraya of Dvaita. Jayatirtha is considered an incarnation of Indra (lord of gods) with amsha of Adi Sesha in the Madhva Parampara.

Born into an aristocratic Deshastha Brahmin family, he later adopted the cause of Dvaita after an encounter with the Madhva saint,  Akshobhya Tirtha (d. 1365 ). He composed 22 works, consisting of commentaries on the works of Madhva and several independent treatises criticizing the tenets of contemporary schools, especially Advaita, while simultaneously elaborating upon the Dvaita thought.

Biography
Historical sources on Jayatirtha's life is scant. Most of the information about his life is derived from two hagiographies: Aṇu Jayatīrtha Vijaya and Bṛhad Jayatīrtha Vijaya from his disciple, Vyāsatirtha (not to be confused with Vyasatirtha) and a compilation by Chalāri Saṁkarṣaṇacārya (c. 1700). According to legendary accounts and the hagiographies,  Jayatirtha is an incarnation of Indra, the lord of gods with amsha of Adi Sesha and have been miraculously favoured by the Goddess Durga (Mahalakshmi). In the previous birth, Indra incarnated as Arjuna and in next life he incarnated as a Bull and carried the load of the library of Madhvacharya throughout the Madhva's wanderings between Udupi and Badrinath.

Jayatirtha was born Dhondopant (or Dhondorao) Raghunath into a Deshpande family of nobles belonging to Marathi-speaking Deshastha Brahmin community in Mangalwedha near Pandarpur present-day in Solapur district, Maharashtra. His father name is Raghunath Pant Deshpande and his mother name is Sakubai. His father was a nobleman of military rank and importance. Dhoṇḍo Pant grew up in affluence, with a certain predilection towards sports, especially horse riding.
At the age of twenty, after a chance encounter with the ascetic Akshobhya Tīrtha on the bank of river Bhima, he underwent a transformation which led him to renounce his former life, but not without resistance from his family. After much deliberation, his family relented and he was subsequently initiated into the Dvaita fold by Akshobhya Tirtha, who named him  . Jayatirtha succeeded Akshobhya as the pontiff in 1365. He composed several commentaries and treatises in the brief span of 23 years between his initiation and death in 1388.

Works

There have been 22 works accredited to Jayatirtha, 18 of which are commentaries on the works of Madhvacharya. Nyaya Sudha, which is a commentary on Madhva's Anu Vyakhyana, is considered to be his magnum opus. Running up to 24,000 verses, it discusses and critiques a variety of philosophers and their philosophies, ranging from the orthodox schools of Hinduism like Mimamsa and Nyaya to heterodox schools like Buddhism and Jainism, arguing in favour of Dvaita.   Apart from commentaries, he has authored 4 original treatises of which Pramana Paddhati and Vadavali stand apart. Pramana Paddhati is a short monograph on the epistemology of Dvaita dealing with the pramanas in question, theory of truth and error and validity of knowledge while Vadavali deals with the nature of reality and illusion.

Legacy
Jayatirtha occupies a special place in the history of Dvaita Literature. The lucidity and measured style of his writing coupled with his keen dialectical ability has allowed his works to percolate through time, reinforced by the commentaries of later philosophers like Vyasatirtha, Vijayindra Tirtha, Raghuttama Tirtha, Raghavendra Tirtha, Satyanatha Tirtha and Vadiraja Tirtha. 
His masterpiece, Nyaya Sudha or Nectar of Logic, deals with refuting an encyclopaedic range of philosophies that were in vogue at the time. Pereira notes "His monumental Nectar of Logic is one of the pinnacles of Indic theological achievement". Dasgupta remarks "Jayatirtha and Vyasatirtha present the highest dialectical skill in Indian thought".

Brindavan
Jayatirtha took brindavana by going into the state of samadhi in 1388 on the bank of the holy river Kagini in Malkhed. Jayatirtha's brindavana (tomb) lies between the brindavanas of Akshobhya Tirtha, and Raghunatha Tirtha. Every year thousands of people attend the aradhana festival from different states of India.

References

Bibliography

External links
Jayatirtha on Dvaita.org

Madhva religious leaders
Dvaita Vedanta
Uttaradi Math
Scholars from Karnataka
Dvaitin philosophers
History of Karnataka
History of Maharashtra
Scholars from Maharashtra
14th-century Indian philosophers
1345 births